Esoteric Funk is the debut and only album by keyboardist Hubert Eaves.

Reception

Released in 1977 on independent jazz label Inner City Records was recorded with help of  James Mtume  and Reggie Lucas.

Track listing
All tracks composed and arranged by Hubert Eaves

Call to Awareness
Painfull Pleasure
Slow Down
Flead Dancing
Song For Marlene
Under Standing

Musicians
Hubert Eaves - all keyboards, vocals on "Slow Down"
Reggie Lucas - electric guitar
James Mtume - congas, percussion
James "Fish" Benjamin - electric bass
John Lee - electric bass on "Slow Down"
Howard King - drums
Rene McLean - reeds, flute
James Stowe - trombone
Malachi Thompson - trumpet
Cheryl Alexander - vocals on "Under Standing"

References

External links
 Hubert Eaves-Esoteric Funk at Discogs

1977 debut albums
Inner City Records albums
Hubert Eaves III albums
East Wind Records albums